The Tuoba dynasty generally refers to the Northern Wei dynasty (386–535) of China, which was ruled by the Tuoba clan (later renamed the Yuan clan) of Xianbei ethnicity.

Tuoba dynasty may also refer to other dynasties ruled by the Tuoba (Yuan) clan:
Dai (Sixteen Kingdoms) (310–376), whose rulers were ancestors to Northern Wei monarchs
Eastern Wei (534–550), one of the short-lived successor states of the Northern Wei
Western Wei (535–557), one of the short-lived successor states of the Northern Wei

See also
Western Xia (1038–1227), a Tangut-led Chinese dynasty whose rulers claimed to be descendants of the Tuoba clan